Sir Reginald Carey "Rex" Harrison (5 March 1907 – 2 June 1990) was a British actor. Harrison began his career on the stage in 1924. He made his West End debut in 1936 appearing in the Terence Rattigan play French Without Tears, in what was his breakthrough role. He won his first Tony Award for his performance as Henry VIII in the play Anne of the Thousand Days in 1949. He won his second Tony for the role of Professor Henry Higgins in the stage production of My Fair Lady in 1957.
 
In addition to his stage career, Harrison also appeared in numerous films. His first starring role was opposite Vivien Leigh in the romantic comedy Storm in a Teacup (1937). Receiving critical acclaim for his performance in Major Barbara (1941), which was shot in London during the Blitz, his roles since then included Blithe Spirit (1945), Anna and the King of Siam (1946), The Ghost and Mrs. Muir (1947), Cleopatra (1963), My Fair Lady (1964), reprising his role as Henry Higgins which earned him the Academy Award for Best Actor, and the titular character in Doctor Dolittle (1967).

In 1975, Harrison released his first autobiography. In June 1989, he was knighted by Queen Elizabeth II. He was married six times and had two sons: Noel and Carey Harrison. He continued working in stage productions until shortly before his death from pancreatic cancer in June 1990 at the age of 82. His second autobiography, A Damned Serious Business: My Life in Comedy, was published posthumously in 1991.

Early life
Reginald Carey Harrison was born on 5 March 1907 at Derry House in Huyton, Lancashire, the son of Edith Mary (née Carey) and William Reginald Harrison, a cotton broker. He was the youngest of three children and had two older sisters, Edith Marjorie Harrison (1900-1976) and Sylvia Margaret Sackville (née Harrison), Countess De La Warr, DBE (1903 or 1904-1992). He was educated at Liverpool College. After a bout of childhood measles, Harrison lost most of the sight in his left eye, which on one occasion caused some on-stage difficulty. To lift Harrison’s spirits up after undergoing this challenge, his mother took him to the theatre. Harrison became determined to pursue a career in acting after seeing a production at a local theatre when he was a child. He refused to take acting lessons and he never took an acting lesson during his six decade long career. Despite his refusal to take acting lessons, he managed to land his very first acting gig when he was  16 years old. Harrison supported Everton FC. He gave himself the stage name “Rex” when he was a child after learning that the name meant “king” in Latin.

Stage career
Harrison first appeared on the stage in 1924 in Liverpool. His acting career was interrupted by World War II, during 
which he served in the Royal Air Force and reached the rank of Flight Lieutenant. He acted in various stage productions until 11 May 1990. He made his West End debut in 1936, appearing in the Terence Rattigan play French Without Tears, which proved to be his breakthrough role, and established him as a leading light comedian of the English stage.

He alternated appearances in London and New York in such plays as Bell, Book and Candle (1950), Venus Observed, The Cocktail Party, The Kingfisher and The Love of Four Colonels, which he also directed. He won his first Tony Award for his appearance at the Shubert Theatre as Henry VIII in Maxwell Anderson's play Anne of the Thousand Days and international superstardom (and a second Tony) for his portrayal of Henry Higgins in the stage musical My Fair Lady, where he appeared opposite Julie Andrews.

Later appearances included Pirandello's Henry IV, a 1984 appearance at the Haymarket Theatre with Claudette Colbert in Frederick Lonsdale's Aren't We All?, and one on Broadway at the Brooks Atkinson Theatre presented by Douglas Urbanski, at the Haymarket in J. M. Barrie's The Admirable Crichton with Edward Fox. He returned as Henry Higgins in the revival of My Fair Lady directed by Patrick Garland in 1981, cementing his association with the plays of George Bernard Shaw, which included a Tony nominated performance as Shotover in Heartbreak House, Julius Caesar in Caesar and Cleopatra, and General Burgoyne in a Los Angeles production of The Devil's Disciple.

Cinema appearances
Harrison's film debut was in The Great Game (1930). His first starring role was in the romantic comedy Storm in a Teacup (1937), opposite Vivien Leigh. Other notable early films include The Citadel (1938), Night Train to Munich (1940), Major Barbara (1941)—filmed in London during The Blitz of 1940, a role for which he received critical acclaim, Blithe Spirit (1945), Anna and the King of Siam (1946), The Ghost and Mrs. Muir (1947), and The Foxes of Harrow (1947). He is best known for his portrayal of Professor Henry Higgins in the 1964 film version of My Fair Lady, based on the 1956 Broadway production (which in turn was based on George Bernard Shaw's 1913 play Pygmalion), for which Harrison won an Oscar for Best Actor.

He also starred in 1967's Doctor Dolittle. At the height of his box office clout after the success of My Fair Lady, Harrison proved a temperamental force during production, demanding auditions for prospective composers after musical playwright Leslie Bricusse was contracted and demanding to have his singing recorded live during shooting, only to agree to have it re-recorded in post-production. He also disrupted production with incidents with his wife, Rachel Roberts and deliberate misbehavior, such as when he intentionally moved his yacht in front of cameras during shooting in St. Lucia and refused to move it out of sight due to contract disputes. Harrison was at one point temporarily replaced by Christopher Plummer, until he agreed to be more cooperative.

He starred in the 1968 comedy The Honey Pot, a modern adaptation of Ben Jonson's play Volpone. Two of his co-stars, Maggie Smith and Cliff Robertson, were to become lifelong friends. Both spoke at his New York City memorial at the Little Church Around the Corner when Harrison died in 1990.

Harrison was not by any objective standards a singer (the talking on pitch style he used in My Fair Lady was adopted by many other classically trained actors with limited vocal ranges); the music was written to allow for long periods of recitative, or "speaking to the music". Nevertheless, "Talk to the Animals", which Harrison performed in Doctor Dolittle, won the Academy Award for Best Original Song in 1967.

Despite excelling in comedy (Noël Coward described him as "The best light comedy actor in the world—except for me."), he attracted favorable notices in dramatic roles such as his portrayal of Julius Caesar in Cleopatra (1963) and as Pope Julius II in The Agony and the Ecstasy (1965), opposite Charlton Heston as Michelangelo. He also acted in a Hindi film Shalimar alongside Indian Bollywood stars Dharmendra and Zeenat Aman as well as appearing opposite Richard Burton as one of two aging homosexuals in Staircase (1969).

Personal life
Alexander Walker wrote: "in looks and temperament, Rex went back to the Elizabethans. They would have called him 'a man of passionate parts'. His physique and looks were far more striking once middle age had literally stretched too smooth and callow a youthful face into a long, saturnine physiognomy, whose hooded eyes and wide mouth had satyr-like associations for some people."

Harrison was married six times. In 1942, he divorced his first wife, Noel Margery Colette-Thomas, and married actress Lilli Palmer the next year; they later appeared together in numerous plays and films, including The Four Poster. Whilst married to Palmer, he built a villa at Portofino, San Genesio, where over the years he hosted showbiz royalty including Laurence Olivier and John Gielgud and real ex-royalty in the Duke of Windsor and his wife.

In 1947, while married to Palmer, Harrison began an affair with actress Carole Landis. Landis took her own life in 1948 after spending the evening with Harrison. Harrison's involvement in the scandal by waiting several hours before calling a doctor and police briefly damaged his career and his contract with Fox was ended by mutual consent. Harrison and Palmer divorced in 1957.

In 1957, Harrison married the actress Kay Kendall. Kendall died of myeloid leukaemia in 1959. Terence Rattigan's 1973 play In Praise of Love was written about the end of this marriage, and Harrison appeared in the New York production playing the character based on himself. Rattigan was said to be "intensely disappointed and frustrated" by Harrison's performance, as "Harrison refused to play the outwardly boorish parts of the character and instead played him as charming throughout, signalling to the audience from the start that he knew the truth about [the] illness." Critics however were quite pleased with the performance and although it did not have a long run, it was yet another of Harrison's well-plotted naturalistic performances.

He was subsequently married to Welsh actress Rachel Roberts from 1962 to 1971. In 1980, despite his having married twice since their divorce, Roberts made a final attempt to win Harrison back, which proved to be futile; she took her own life that same year.

Harrison then married Elizabeth Rees-Williams, divorcing in 1975; finally, in 1978, he married Mercia Tinker, his sixth and final wife. Harrison's eldest son Noel Harrison became an Olympic skier, singer and occasional actor; he toured in several productions including My Fair Lady in his father's award-winning role; Noel died suddenly of a heart attack on 19 October 2013 at age 79. Rex's younger son Carey Harrison is a playwright and social activist.

Harrison's sister Sylvia was married to the 1st Earl of Kilmuir (better known to history as Sir David Maxwell Fyfe), a lawyer, Conservative politician and judge who was successively the lead British prosecutor at Nuremberg, Home Secretary and Lord Chancellor (head of the English judiciary); after his death she married another Cabinet minister, the 9th Earl De La Warr.

Chronology of Harrison's six marriages:
 Noel M Colette-Thomas, 1934–1942 (divorced); one son, the actor/singer Noel Harrison, (29 January 1934 – 19 October 2013)
 Lilli Palmer, 1943–1957 (divorced); one son, the novelist/playwright Carey Harrison (born 19 February 1944)
 Kay Kendall, 1957–1959 (her death)
 Rachel Roberts, 1962–1971 (divorced)
 Elizabeth Rees-Williams, 1971–1975 (divorced); three stepsons, Damian Harris, Jared Harris, and Jamie Harris
 Mercia Tinker, 1978–1990 (his death)

Grandchildren:
 Granddaughters: Cathryn, Harriott, Chloe, Chiara, Rosie, Faith
 Grandsons: Will, Simon, Sam

Harrison owned properties in London, New York City and Portofino, Italy. His villa in Portofino was named San Genesio after the patron saint of actors.

Later career
Having retired from films after A Time to Die, Harrison continued to act on Broadway and the West End until the end of his life, despite suffering from glaucoma, painful teeth, and a failing memory. He was nominated for a third Tony Award in 1984 for his performance as Captain Shotover in the revival of George Bernard Shaw's Heartbreak House. He followed with two successful pairings with Claudette Colbert, The Kingfisher in 1985 and Aren't We All? in 1986. In 1989, he appeared with Edward Fox in The Admirable Crichton in London. In 1989/90, he appeared on Broadway in The Circle by W. Somerset Maugham, opposite Glynis Johns, Stewart Granger, and Roma Downey. The production opened at Duke University for a three-week run followed by performances in Baltimore and Boston before opening 14 November 1989 on Broadway.

Death
Harrison died from the effects of pancreatic cancer at his home in Manhattan, New York City, on 2 June 1990 at the age of 83. He had only been diagnosed with the disease a short time before. The stage production in which he was appearing at the time, The Circle, came to an end upon his death.

His body was cremated, some of his ashes being subsequently scattered in Portofino, and the rest being scattered at his second wife Lilli Palmer's grave at Forest Lawn Memorial Park in Glendale, California, in the Commemoration section, Map 1, Lot 4066, Space 2.

Harrison's second autobiography, A Damned Serious Business: My Life in Comedy, was published posthumously in 1991.

Honours and legacy
On 17 June 1989, Harrison was knighted by Queen Elizabeth II at Buckingham Palace.

Rex Harrison has two stars on the Hollywood Walk of Fame, one at 6906 Hollywood Boulevard for his contribution to films, and the other at 6380 Hollywood Boulevard for his contribution to television. Harrison is also a member of the American Theater Hall of Fame. He was inducted in 1979.

Due to his association with the checked wool hat which he wore both in the Broadway and film versions of My Fair Lady, the style of headwear was often named "The Rex Harrison."

Seth MacFarlane, creator of the animated series Family Guy, modelled the voice of the character Stewie Griffin after Harrison following seeing him in the film adaptation of My Fair Lady.

Rex Harrison mask used by CIA 
Ex-CIA chief of disguise Jonna Mendez stated in 2019 that a mask of Harrison was used by multiple CIA agents for covert work. The moulds of his face were larger and so could fit over a smaller agents face. The molds were made from aluminium and bought from Hollywood film facilities. She mentioned that his likeness was "taking part in a lot of operations". According to Mendez, Rex Harrison's aluminium facial props mold was used as a baseline for over-the-head masks that the agency would create and use operationally. The masks came in small, medium and large sizes, with Rex's mold becoming the agency's standard "large" size. Subsequently, many undercover operatives' real identities were disguised by masks bearing Rex's facial features.

Filmography

Film

Television

Radio

Stage

Radio appearances

References

Sources

Further reading
 Harrison, Rex (1991). A Damned Serious Business: My Life in Comedy. 
 Garland, Patrick (1998). The Incomparable Rex. (1998) 
 Roberts, David (2006). British Hit Singles & Albums (19th ed.). London: Guinness World Records Limited. 
  (Includes an interview with Harrison's son, Carey)

External links

 
 Selected performances in Theatre Archive University of Bristol
 
 
 
 
 Rex Harrison interview on BBC Radio 4 Desert Island Discs, 26 October 1979

1908 births
1990 deaths
20th-century English male actors
20th Century Studios contract players
Actors awarded knighthoods
Best Actor Academy Award winners
Best Musical or Comedy Actor Golden Globe (film) winners
British expatriate male actors in the United States
Burials at Forest Lawn Memorial Park (Glendale)
Deaths from cancer in New York (state)
David di Donatello winners
Deaths from pancreatic cancer
Drama Desk Award winners
English expatriates in the United States
English male film actors
English male stage actors
English male television actors
20th-century English memoirists
Knights Bachelor
Male actors from Merseyside
People educated at Liverpool College
People from Huyton
Royal Air Force officers
Royal Air Force personnel of World War II
Special Tony Award recipients
Tony Award winners